is a notation used  in professional sumo wrestling to record a lower-ranked (maegashira) wrestler's victory over a yokozuna.

It is believed that the term stems from the usage of the terms shiroboshi (lit: white star) to designate a bout victory, and kuroboshi (black star) to designate a bout defeat. Thus, a "gold star" designates it as a special victory.

The word kinboshi first came into popular use in the Taishō period (1912-1926), and the system of monetarily awarding a maegashira who defeated a yokozuna in an official tournament began in January, 1930.

A kinboshi victory increases the balance in the maegashiras mochikyūkin account by 10 yen. This balance is converted using a multiplier, presently 4,000, and added to the wrestler's bonus in every subsequent tournament in which he competes as a sekitori. With six tournaments a year, this one victory corresponds to a pay increase of 240,000 yen per annum for the remainder of the wrestler's sekitori career.

The kinboshi record is held by former sekiwake Akinoshima who won 16 bouts against yokozuna when ranked as a maegashira.

Restrictions

Kinboshi are not awarded to san'yaku ranked wrestlers who defeat a yokozuna, nor is it awarded if the maegashira beats a yokozuna with a default win (or fusenshō). It is also not given if the yokozuna is disqualified for using an illegal move (or hansoku).

Other uses

Ginboshi (銀星 or silver star) is also used informally to denote a maegashira victory over an ōzeki. However, there is no monetary bonus for such a win, nor are official ginboshi records kept. The unofficial record holder for silver star victories is Aminishiki, with 47.

The term kinboshi is used outside sumo in informal language. It can mean a major victory, or (in slang) a beautiful woman.

List of kinboshi records
Tables for both kinboshi earned (by maegashira) and those conceded (by yokozuna) are given below.
Kinboshi appearing in individual wrestlers' records before they began to be awarded in January, 1930 are unofficial and retrospectively conferred.

List of top kinboshi earners

Kinboshi earned by active wrestlers
This is a running list of the number of all kinboshi earned by all currently active wrestlers.

All time kinboshi earned by wrestlers
This list includes the top kinboshi earners since records began. 

Kinboshi conceded

Active yokozuna kinboshi ratio
This is a running list of kinboshi ratio conceded by the currently active yokozuna.

All time lowest kinboshi ratio
This list has the top five yokozuna who have conceded the lowest ratio of kinboshi since official records began. Active yokozuna are listed in bold'''.Tsunenohana's yokozuna career ended very shortly after official kinboshi records came into effect in January 1930; therefore his record has not been included.''

See also
List of sumo top division champions
List of sumo record holders
Glossary of sumo terms

References

Sumo terminology